Mokré Lazce is a municipality and village in Opava District in the Moravian-Silesian Region of the Czech Republic. It has about 1,100 inhabitants.

Geography
The municipality is located on the right bank of the Opava River, which forms the northern municipal border.

History
The first written mention of Mokré Lazce is from 1377.

References

External links

Villages in Opava District